Spirastrella coccinea is a species of marine sponge in the family Spirastrellidae. It is found in the tropical western Atlantic Ocean, the Caribbean Sea, the Gulf of Mexico.

Description
The texture of the sponge is smooth and leathery, red on the surface and brownish-red or orange in the interior. Sponges in shallow water are orangish-red while those at greater depths are red or pink, sometimes with white specks near the oscula. The spicules that stiffen the sponge and form the skeleton are tylostyles, rods with one end pointed and the other knobbed, and there are also microscleres in the tissues, but no spongin fibres.

Distribution and habitat
Spirastrella coccinea is found in the Caribbean Sea, the Gulf of Mexico and the tropical western Atlantic Ocean as far south as Brazil.

Research
Being soft-bodied, sessile organisms that lack physical defences, sponges have developed chemical defences to protect them from predation. Many of these compounds are bioactive and are of interest in pharmaceutical research. A novel mitotic inhibitor macrolide known as "Sprirastrellolide A" has been isolated from Spirastrella coccinea. The methyl ester of Sprirastrellolide A has the unusual biological property of causing cells to start dividing when they are at other stages of the cell cycle, before stopping them dividing partway through the process. Another macrolide, "Sprirastrellolide B", has also been isolated and its structure elucidated. Since then, five further macrolides, "Sprirastrellolide C to G" have been found in extracts of the sponge, their structures being elucidated by spectroscopic analysis and chemical means.

References

Demospongiae
Animals described in 1864